The Coupe de France is a tournament in which all FFF affiliated teams can participate, including those from clubs from the overseas departments and territories (Guadeloupe, French Guiana, Martinique, Mayotte, New Caledonia, Tahiti, Réunion and Saint Pierre and Miquelon). This is the list of overseas teams that played a match in the main competition.

Overview 
The Coupe de France was opened to overseas teams from the 1961–62 season, with the entry of one team.

From the 1962–63 season to the 1972–73 season, two teams were admitted to the competition.

In the 1974–75 season, the Golden Star was the first overseas team to beat a continental team in the competition and to hit the Round of 64.

In the 1988–89 season, ASC Le Geldar de Kourou was the first team to hit the Round of 32.

Results

Notes

References

External links 

Coupe de France
Association football in France lists
Lists of association football matches